Ahmad ibn Farrukh, also written Ahmad-i Farrokh, was a 12th-century Persian physician from Herat.

He was one of the teachers of Zayn al-Din al-Jurjani. 

He is author of a Persian medicine encyclopaedia titled Kifayah that is no longer extant though it had a high reputation among scholars long after al-Jurjani's day.

The National Library of Medicine has in its collection a formulary of compound remedies (Qarabadhin).

This formulary in 11 short chapters (babs), and it appears to be the only preserved example of the writings of Ahmad ibn Farrukh.

See also

List of Iranian scientists
Medical Encyclopedia of Islam and Iran

References

12th-century Iranian physicians